Ronnie Dunn is the debut solo studio album by the American country music artist of the same name. It was released on June 7, 2011, by Arista Nashville. The album was Dunn's first release of solo music in nearly 25 years; he released three singles in the 1980s without issuing an album.

The album's first single, "Bleed Red", was released to country music radio on January 31, 2011, and became a top ten hit on the Billboard Hot Country Songs chart. A second single, "Cost of Livin'", was scheduled to be released to radio on June 27, 2011, but the single entered the country chart two weeks before its release, debuting at number 56.

Background
Ronnie Dunn is Dunn's first solo music in 25 years and appeared less than a year after his split as one-half of Brooks & Dunn. Dunn wrote or co-wrote nine of the album's twelve tracks. "Bleed Red", the first single, was not one of them.

Track listing

Personnel

 Mike Brignardello – bass guitar
 Jim "Moose" Brown – piano
 Perry Coleman – background vocals
 J.T. Corenflos – electric guitar
 Melodie Crittenden – background vocals
 Chad Cromwell – drums
 Eric Darken – percussion
 Ronnie Dunn – lead vocals
 Mike Durham – electric guitar
 Shawn Fichter – drums
 Shannon Forrest – drums, percussion
 Paul Franklin – steel guitar
 Kevin "Swine" Grantt – bass guitar
 Trey Gray – drums
 Ashley Greenberg – background vocals
 Kenny Greenberg – electric guitar
 Joe Hardy – piano
 Rob Harrington – bass guitar
 Mike Haynes – trumpet
 Wes Hightower – background vocals
 Charles Judge – keyboards, piano, synthesizer
 Kim Keyes – background vocals
 Tony King – acoustic guitar
 Troy Lancaster – electric guitar
 Pat McGrath – acoustic guitar
 Jerry McPherson – electric guitar
 Gary Morse – steel guitar
 The Nashville String Machine – strings
 Kim Parent – background vocals
 Steve Patrick – trumpet
 Michael Payne – electric guitar
 Brian Pruitt – drums
 Michael Rhodes – bass guitar
 Dwaine Rowe – keyboards, organ
 Jimmie Lee Sloas – bass guitar
 Judsen Spence – background vocals
 Bryan Sutton – acoustic guitar, mandolin
 Lou Toomey – acoustic guitar, electric guitar
 Bergen White – string arrangements, conductor
 John Willis – acoustic guitar
 Glenn Worf – bass guitar
 Reese Wynans – organ, piano

Chart performance
Ronnie Dunn debuted at number 5 on the Billboard 200 and number one on the Top Country Albums, selling 45,000 copies in the U.S. Up to August 2016, the album had sold 266,000 copies in the US.

Weekly charts

Year-end charts

Singles

Notes

2011 debut albums
Ronnie Dunn albums
Arista Records albums